Peterslahr is a municipality in the district of Altenkirchen, in Rhineland-Palatinate, Germany.

References

External links
 
 Cultural heritage monuments in Peterslahr, Wikimedia Commons

Altenkirchen (district)